In combinatorics, bijective proof is a proof technique for proving that two sets have equally many elements, or that the sets in two combinatorial classes have equal size, by finding a bijective function that maps one set one-to-one onto the other. This technique can be useful as a way of finding a formula for the number of elements of certain sets, by corresponding them with other sets that are easier to count. Additionally, the nature of the bijection itself often provides powerful insights into each or both of the sets.

Basic examples

Proving the symmetry of the binomial coefficients 

The symmetry of the binomial coefficients states that

This means that there are exactly as many combinations of  things in a set of size  as there are combinations of  things in a set of size .

A bijective proof 

The key idea of the proof may be understood from a simple example: selecting  children to be rewarded with ice cream cones, out of a group of  children, has exactly the same effect as choosing instead the  children to be denied ice cream cones. 

To show that f is a bijection, first assume that , that is to say, . Take the complements of each side (in ), using the fact that the complement of a complement of a set is the original set,  to obtain . This shows that  is one-to-one. Since ,  is also onto and thus a bijection. The result now follows since the existence of a bijection between these finite sets shows that they have the same size, that is, .

Other examples 

Problems that admit bijective proofs are not limited to binomial coefficient identities. As the complexity of the problem increases, a bijective proof can become very sophisticated. This technique is particularly useful in areas of discrete mathematics such as combinatorics, graph theory, and number theory.

The most classical examples of bijective proofs in combinatorics include:
 Prüfer sequence, giving a proof of Cayley's formula for the number of labeled trees.
 Robinson-Schensted algorithm, giving a proof of Burnside's formula for the symmetric group.
 Conjugation of Young diagrams, giving a proof of a classical result on the number of certain integer partitions.
 Bijective proofs of the pentagonal number theorem.
 Bijective proofs of the formula for the Catalan numbers.

See also
 Binomial theorem
 Schröder–Bernstein theorem
 Double counting (proof technique)
 Combinatorial principles
 Combinatorial proof
 Categorification

References

Further reading
 Loehr, Nicholas A. (2011).  Bijective Combinatorics.  CRC Press.  ,  .

External links 
"Division by three" – by Doyle and Conway.  
"A direct bijective proof of the hook-length formula" –  by Novelli, Pak and Stoyanovsky. 
"Bijective census and random generation of Eulerian planar maps with prescribed vertex degrees" –  by Gilles Schaeffer.
"Kathy O'Hara's Constructive Proof of the Unimodality of the Gaussian Polynomials" – by Doron Zeilberger.
"Partition Bijections, a Survey" – by Igor Pak.
Garsia-Milne Involution Principle – from MathWorld.

Enumerative combinatorics
Articles containing proofs
Mathematical proofs